Mount Wild is a sharply defined rock ridge with several summits, the highest 945 m, standing at the north side of the entrance to Sjögren Inlet on the east coast of Trinity Peninsula in Graham Land, Antarctica. First charted by the Falkland Islands Dependencies Survey (FIDS) in 1945 and named for Frank Wild.

References
 SCAR Composite Antarctic Gazetteer.

Mountains of Trinity Peninsula